The 2022 Challenger Tenis Club Argentino was a professional tennis tournament played on clay courts. It was the first edition of the tournament which was part of the 2022 ATP Challenger Tour. It took place in Buenos Aires, Argentina between 20 and 26 June 2022.

Singles main-draw entrants

Seeds

 1 Rankings are as of 13 June 2022.

Other entrants
The following players received wildcards into the singles main draw:
  Valerio Aboian
  Alex Barrena
  Juan Bautista Otegui

The following player received entry into the singles main draw as an alternate:
  Ignacio Monzón

The following players received entry from the qualifying draw:
  Leonardo Aboian
  Guido Andreozzi
  Tomás Farjat
  Juan Ignacio Galarza
  Naoki Nakagawa
  Fermín Tenti

Champions

Singles

  Francisco Comesaña def.  Mariano Navone 6–4, 6–0.

Doubles

  Arklon Huertas del Pino /  Conner Huertas del Pino def.  Matías Franco Descotte /  Alejo Lorenzo Lingua Lavallén 7–5, 4–6, [11–9].

References

2022 ATP Challenger Tour
2022 in Argentine tennis
June 2022 sports events in Argentina